The Grêmio Recreativo Escola de Samba Acadêmicos da Rocinha is a samba school in Rio de Janeiro, located in the neighborhood of São Conrado on Bertha Lutz street.

History
The Academic Rocinha samba school comes from three carnivals of favela da Rocinha, the "Empire of the Topsail", "Young Blood" and "United Rocinha". The Scholars of Rocinha's symbol is the butterfly, and the colors are blue, green and white.

It paraded for the first time as a samba school in 1989 by Group 4 in Intendente Magalhães in Campinho, with the carnival Joãosinho Trinta. That year the school was crowned champion and ascended to the Joãosinho Trinta. Two more championships in a row by Group 3. in 1990 and Group 2 in 1991 led to Group 1 where it remained until 1996, when it won second place, which earned it the right to march for the first time in the Special.

Since 2002, the Academic Rocinha has remained in Group A and in 2005, with the plot "Um mundo sem fronteiras", the school became champion of the Grupo de acesso A. This guaranteed the right to march again in 2006 by the Grupo Especial. The school group finished the show with 371.7 points.

In carnival 2008, the auxiliary Max Lopes debuted in a carnival at Mangueira, Fábio Ricardo. That year Rocinha was runner-up, behind the Império Serrano, the champion.

In 2009, the school of São Conrado honored cartoonist J. Carlos with the plot has francesinha the hall .. The river in my heart, getting 3rd place with 239 points, staying in the Grupo de acesso A 2010.

For Carnival 2010, Rocinha returned Fábio Ricardo to the carnival, seeking another access to the panel with the plot Ykamiabas (copyright), based on the book Ykamiabas - Daughters of the Moon, Women of the Earth. It told the story of women warriors who came to the Amazon ten thousand years ago.

Persons who parade for the school
 Adriane Galisteu
 Mônica Nascimento
 Luiza Brunet
 Patrícia Amorim
 Mel Fronckowiak

Classifications

References

External links
  Official site

Samba schools of Rio de Janeiro
Musical groups established in 1989